Oscar Durity (born 14 August 1950) is a Trinidadian cricketer. He played in twenty-four first-class matches for Trinidad and Tobago from 1968 to 1973.

See also
 List of Trinidadian representative cricketers

References

External links
 

1950 births
Living people
Trinidad and Tobago cricketers